Colleen Thorburn-Smith (born 19 August 1972) is a Canadian softball player. She played for Kennesaw State University from 1992 to 1995. She also competed at the 1996 Summer Olympics and the 2000 Summer Olympics.

References

External links
 

1972 births
Living people
Canadian softball players
Olympic softball players of Canada
Softball players at the 1996 Summer Olympics
Softball players at the 2000 Summer Olympics
Sportspeople from Toronto